Şahruh Bridge is a historical bridge in Turkey located in the village of Karaözü in the Sarıoğlan ilçe (district) of Kayseri province.

There is no record of the construction of the bridge but, according to an inscription about the restoration of the bridge in 1538, it was commissioned by Şahruh of Dulkadirids and was restored by his son Mehmet. Şahruh was the son of Bozkurt of Dulkadir. During a family dispute, Şahruh was punished by his uncle Shah Budak in the 1480s, so the bridge must have been built before 1480.

The arch bridge is over Kızılırmak River ("Halys" in antiquity). The highest point of the bridge is  The bridge is still in use.

See also

 List of bridges in Turkey

References

Buildings and structures in Kayseri Province
15th-century establishments in the Ottoman Empire
Anatolia Beyliks bridges
Arch bridges in Turkey
Deck arch bridges
Bridges over the Kızılırmak